Kaccimayanesvarar Temple is a Siva temple in Kanchipuram in Tamil Nadu (India).

Vaippu Sthalam
It is one of the shrines of the Vaippu Sthalams sung by Tamil Saivite Nayanar Appar.

Presiding deity
The presiding deity is known as Kaccimayanesvarar and Mayana Lingesvarar.

Speciality
This temple is in the campus of  Ekambareswarar Temple in Kanchipuram. This temple is found as a separate shrine, next to flagpost, at the right side. facing west.

References

Hindu temples in Kanchipuram district
Shiva temples in Kanchipuram district